Kangayam is a state assembly constituency in tirupur district in Tamil Nadu. Its State Assembly Constituency number is 102. It consists of Kangayam taluk and a portion of Perundurai taluk. It falls under Tiruppur Lok Sabha constituency. It is one of the 234 State Legislative Assembly Constituencies in Tamil Nadu, in India.

Madras State 

*By election

Tamil Nadu

Election results

2021

2016

2011

2006

2001

1996

1991 By-election

1991

1989

1984

1980

1977

1971

1967

1962

1957

1952

References 

 

Assembly constituencies of Tamil Nadu
Erode district